Denmark is an unincorporated community in Curry County, Oregon, United States, between Bandon and Port Orford where  U.S. Route 101 crosses Willow Creek.

Denmark was founded by first generation Danes who developed a profitable dairy industry in the area. Denmark post office was established in 1882. In 1915 the community had a sawmill, a cheese factory, a creamery, and a public school. In 1940 Denmark had a population of 96. Improvements to U.S. 101 bypassed the business district and the community went into decline. The post office closed in 1960. By the 1990s, the only business in Denmark was a store/gas station. In 2009 there was a drive-through espresso stand at the same location.

Denmark was the focus of a 2009 series of articles on Oregon Public Broadcasting (OPB) about climate change that coincided with the Copenhagen Summit in the country of Denmark.

Climate
This region experiences warm and dry summers, with no average monthly temperatures above .  According to the Köppen climate classification system, Denmark has a warm-summer Mediterranean climate, abbreviated "Csb" on climate maps.

References

Danish-American culture in Oregon
Unincorporated communities in Curry County, Oregon
1882 establishments in Oregon
Populated places established in 1882
Unincorporated communities in Oregon